Neocrepidodera melanopus is a species of flea beetle from Chrysomelidae family that can be found in Andorra, France, and Spain.

References

Beetles described in 1860
Beetles of Europe
melanopus